Shepard Siegel is a Canadian psychologist, having been a Distinguished University Professor at McMaster University. He is a Fellow of the Royal Society of Canada and Society of Experimental Psychologists.

References

Year of birth missing (living people)
Living people
Academic staff of McMaster University
Canadian psychologists